Synthese is a scholarly periodical specializing in papers in epistemology, methodology, and philosophy of science, and related issues. Its subject area is divided into four specialties, with a focus on the first three: (1) "epistemology, methodology, and philosophy of science, all broadly understood"; (2) "foundations of logic and mathematics, where 'logic', 'mathematics', and 'foundations' are all broadly understood"; (3) "formal methods in philosophy, including methods connecting philosophy to other academic fields"; and (4) "issues in ethics and the history and sociology of logic, mathematics, and science that contribute to the contemporary studies".

As of 2022, according to Google Scholar's metrics (h-5 index and h-5 index median), it is the top philosophy journal, but other metrics do not rank the journal as highly.

Overview
Published articles include specific treatment of methodological issues in science such as induction, probability, causation, statistics, symbolic logic, linguistics and ethics. The name Synthese (from the Dutch for synthesis) finds its origin in the intentions of its founding editors: making explicit the supposed internal coherence between the different, highly specialised scientific disciplines.

Jaakko Hintikka was the editor-in-chief of Synthese from 1965 to 2002. The current editors-in-chief are Otávio Bueno, Wiebe van der Hoek, and Kristie Miller.

Editorial decision controversies 
In 2011, Synthese became involved in a controversy over intelligent design. The printed version of the special issue Evolution and Its Rivals of the journal, which appeared two years after the online version, was supplied with a disclaimer from the then editors of the journal that "appeared to undermine [the authors] and the guest editors".

Synthese engendered controversy again in 2016, when an article printed in it was called a "homophobic and sexist rant".

"Due to an unfortunate human error", one of the articles accepted to the special issue Logic and Relativity Theory of the journal was not sent by the guest editor to the editors of the journal for approval as the then current policies had required. Upon the discovery of this discrepancy, the then editors of the journal imposed a moratorium on new special issues for approximately two-three months pending review of the policies.

See also 
 List of scientific journals
 List of philosophy journals

Notes

External links
 Editorial board

Logic journals
Philosophy of science journals
Springer Science+Business Media academic journals
Journals published between 13 and 25 times per year
English-language journals